A metadata standard is a requirement which is intended to establish a common understanding of the meaning or semantics of the data, to ensure correct and proper use and interpretation of the data by its owners and users. To achieve this common understanding, a number of characteristics, or attributes of the data have to be defined, also known as metadata.

Metadata
Metadata is often defined as data about data. It is “structured information that describes, explains, locates, or otherwise makes it easier to retrieve, use or manage an information resource”, especially in a distributed network environment like for example the internet or an organization. A good example of metadata is the cataloging system found in libraries, which records for example the author, title, subject, and location on the shelf of a resource.  Another is software system knowledge extraction of software objects such as data flows, control flows, call maps, architectures, business rules, business terms, and database schemas.

Metadata is usually categorized in three types:
Descriptive metadata describes an information resource for identification and retrieval through elements such as title, author, and abstract.
Structural metadata documents relationships within and among objects through elements such as links to other components (e.g., how pages are put together to form chapters).
Administrative metadata helps to manage information resources through elements such as version number, archiving date, and other technical information for purposes of file management, rights management and preservation.

Available metadata standards
Metadata elements grouped into sets designed for a specific purpose, e.g., for a specific domain or a particular type of information resource, are called metadata schemas. For every element the name and the semantics (the meaning of the element) are specified. Content rules (how content must be formulated), representation rules (e.g., capitalization rules), and allowed element values (e.g., from a controlled vocabulary) can be specified optionally. Some schemas also specify in which syntax the elements must be encoded, in contrast to syntax independent schemas. Many current schemas use Standard Generalized Markup Language (SGML) or XML to specify their syntax. Metadata schemas that are developed and maintained by standard organizations (such as ISO) or organizations that have taken on such responsibility (such as the Dublin Core Metadata Initiative) are called metadata standards.

Many different metadata schemas are being developed as standards across disciplines, such as library science, education, archiving, e-commerce, and arts. In the table below, an overview of available metadata standards is given.

Sources:

See also
Data dictionary
Metadata
Metamodeling
Metadata registry
BioSharing - registry of standards in the life sciences

References

 
Records management